William H. Davis may refer to:
 William Hammatt Davis (1879–1964), American politician
 William Hatcher Davis (1939–2017), professor at Auburn University
 William H. Davis (educator) (1848–1938), American educator and school administrator 
 William H. Davis (sheriff), sheriff of Allegheny County from 1954 to 1970
 William H. Davis (Pennsylvania state representative), in office 1854
 William H. Davis (Pennsylvania state senator) (1900–1955), in office 1955

See also
William Davis (disambiguation)